Loch Eil Outward Bound railway station is a railway station on the northern bank of Loch Eil in the Highland region of Scotland. This station is on the West Highland Line, between Corpach and Locheilside, sited  from Banavie Junction, near Fort William. ScotRail, who manage the station, operate all services.

History 

This station opened by British Rail in May 1985. Its name refers to the nearby Outward Bound centre that the station was built to serve.

Signalling 
The RETB is controlled from a Signalling Centre at Banavie railway station. The Train Protection & Warning System was installed in 2003.

Facilities 
The station has a single platform equipped with a shelter, a bench, a help point and some bike racks, as well as a small car park. The station has step-free access from the car park, as well as to the waterfront at Loch Eil. As there are no facilities to purchase tickets, passengers must buy one in advance, or from the guard on the train.

Passenger volume 

The statistics cover twelve month periods that start in April.

Services
From Monday to Saturday, three trains stop heading to Glasgow Queen Street (the other terminates at Fort William), and four trains stop on the way to Mallaig. On Sundays, this is reduced to three trains each way (again, one of the eastbound services terminates at Fort William).

References

External Links 

 Video footage of the station on YouTube

Railway stations in Highland (council area)
Railway stations opened by British Rail
Railway stations in Great Britain opened in 1985
Railway stations served by ScotRail